The Sondu Miriu Hydroelectric Power Station is a hydroelectric power station on the Sondu River in Kenya.

Location
The coordinates of the power station are:0°20'33.0"S, 34°51'08.0"E (Latitude:0°20'33.0"S; Longitude:34°51'08.0"E).

Overview
The power station is unique because it is not located directly on the river from which it derives the water that powers it. At the intake point, water is diverted to the power station, via a  intake tunnel. A  135kV transmission line carries the power from the power station to a substation in Kisumu, where it is integrated into the national electricity grid. Construction lasted 10 years, with a loan from the Japan Bank for International Cooperation at a total cost of Sh19 billion (US$249 million).

Other considerations
After Sondu Miriu was built, another associated power station, the  Sang'oro Hydroelectric Power Station, was built between 2007 and 2013, using the water discharge from Sondu Miriu as its intake.

Ownership
Sondu Miriu Hydroelectric Power Station is 100 percent owned by Kenya Electricity Generating Company, a parastatal company of the government of Kenya.

See also

List of power stations in Kenya

References

External links
Kisumu: Irony of dark city that hosts power plants

Hydroelectric power stations in Kenya
Dams in Kenya
Dams completed in 2009
Energy infrastructure completed in 2009